This article lists the albums attributed to the series Macross Frontier. The entire scores of the series were composed by Yoko Kanno. Two Japanese pop singers, May'n and Megumi Nakajima under stagenames Sheryl Nome starring May'n and Ranka Lee = Megumi Nakajima, have lent their voices to the songs of two fictional songtresses Sheryl Nome and Ranka Lee. Singer and voice actress Maaya Sakamoto also make an appearance as Ranshe Mei, Ranka's mother. Macross Frontier music has received a big success in Japan with all albums and singles making the Oricon weekly charts top 3, in total, Macross Frontier music has sold more than 900,000 copies in Japan.

Albums

O.S.T.1 Nyan FRO.

 is the first soundtrack album of Macross Frontier. The album features opening, ending themes and insert songs from the first half of the series.

Track listing

O.S.T.2 Nyan TRA☆

 is the second soundtrack album of Macross Frontier. The album features opening, ending themes and insert songs from the second half of the series.

Track listing

Vocal Collection Nyan Tama♀

 is a complete collection compilation album of opening-ending themes and insert songs of Macross Frontier. This album also features unreleased songs from the two soundtracks.

Track listing

Universal Bunny

 is May'n's Sheryl Nome mini-album for the first movie adaptation of Macross Frontier. The mini-album includes pink monsoon as its leading single which is used as an insert song and was released one month ahead at May'n's 20th birthday. The second songs revealed is Universal Bunny which was used as the commercial song for the movie.

Track listing

Macross Frontier Concept Album "cosmic cuune" 

 is a Christmas-themed compilation from the anime series “Macross Frontier” including tunes newly composed by Yoko Kanno. It was initially announced that the album would include seven tracks, but one more track was added later. The resulting eight tracks are: two songs by Ranka, two by Sheryl, three duets by the two singers, and one by the two singers and the "Frontier Stars." The "Stars" are: Alto, Ranka, Sheryl, Michel, Clan, Bobby, Monica, and Ram. The Sheryl included in the Stars refers to voice actress Aya Endo, who participates as voice-over.

Songs from this album will be featured in two concerts entitled "Chōjiku [Super-dimensional] Super Live: Merry Christmas Without You", one to be held at Budokan on December 22, 2010 and the other at Kobe Port Island Hall (World Memory Hall) on December 24, 2010.

Track listing

Macross Frontier ~Sayonara no Tsubasa~ Netabare Album The End of "Triangle"

 is the soundtrack album for the second movie adaptation of Macross Frontier entitled Macross Frontier ~Sayonara no Tsubasa~.

Track listing

Singles

Triangler 

"Triangler" is the first opening of Macross Frontier.

Diamond Crevasse / Iteza Gogo Kuji Don't be late 

 is May'n's re-debut single under Victor Entertainment label, released under stage name Sheryl Nome starring May'n. The song "Diamond Crevasse" was used as the second ending theme for Macross Frontier and "Iteza☆Gogo Kuji Don't be late" as an insert song performed by Sheryl Nome in the series.

Track listing

Seikan Hikō

 is the debut single of both Megumi Nakajima and Ranka Lee. The songs "Ai Oboete Imasu ka" and "Watashi no Kare wa Pilot" were covers of Lynn Minmay's songs from The Super Dimension Fortress Macross and Macross: Do You Remember Love?.

Track listing

Lion

 is May'n's fifth single and Megumi Nakajima's second single. "Lion" and "Northern Cross" were used as the second opening and ending theme for Macross Frontier.

Track listing

Sheryl no Uchū Kyōdaibune Nado.

 is Sheryl Nome and Bobby Margot's special release. The single features Sheryl's cover of Ichirō Dokugawa's "Uchū Kyōdaibune" and Bobby's cover of Ranka Lee's "Ninjīn Loves you yeah!"

Track listing

Ranka to Bobby no SMS Shōtai no Uta Nado.

 is Ranka Lee and Bobby Margot's special release. The single features Ranka's cover of "SMS Platoon Theme" and Bobby's cover of Lynn Minmay's "Watashi no Kare wa Pilot"

pink monsoon 

"pink monsoon" is May'n's fourth single, released under stage name Sheryl Nome starring May'n. The song "pink monsoon" is described as Sheryl Nome's debut single released at the age of 16 and was used as insert songs for the first movie adaptation of Macross Frontier along with "Tenshi ni Nacchatta". A preview for "pink monsoon" was featured in Macross Frontier Drama CD◎Nyan Dra Dra4.

Track listing

CM Ranka

, this single contains songs sung by Megumi Nakajima in the movie Macross Frontier The Movie: The False Songstress, the song "Sō da yo" was used as ending theme of the movie, from second to seventh track are songs of commercials sung by Ranka in the movie, except Ninjin loves you yeah!. The eighth track on the CD was confirmed on the official website of Flying Dog.

Track listing

Hōkago Overflow 

 is the second single release from Ranka Lee for the movie Macross Frontier The Movie: The Wings of Goodbye. The single includes the B-side "Get it on-flying rock", sung with Sheryl, used in the PlayStation Portable game Macross Triangle Frontier.

Track listing

Drama CDs
After the TV series of Macross Frontier ended in October 2008, a series of four drama CDs was announced titled , released each month from April to July 2009.

Nyan Dra 1

 is the first CD of the drama series. This drama CD features "Shao Pai Long", Lynn Minmay's songs from The Super Dimension Fortress Macross covered by Yuichi Nakamura and Sōichirō Hoshi under Alto Saotome and Brera Sterne character.

Track listing

Nyan Dra 2

 is the second CD of the drama series. This drama CD features "Runner", Lynn Minmay's songs from The Super Dimension Fortress Macross covered by Hiroshi Kamiya and Megumi Toyoguchi under Micheal Blanc and Klan Klan character.

Track listing

Nyan Dra 3

 is the third CD of the drama series. This drama CD features "Totsugeki Love Heart", FIRE BOMBER's songs from Macross 7 covered by Katsuyuki Konishi, Sanae Kobayashi and Kenta Miyake under Ozma Lee, Catherine Glass and Bobby Margot character.

Track listing

Nyan Dra 4

 is the last CD of the drama series. This drama CD features "0-G Love", Lynn Minmay's songs from The Super Dimension Fortress Macross covered by Kikuko Inoue and Tomokazu Sugita under Grace O'Connor and Leon Mishima character.

Track listing

External links
Tagged entries at MusicBrainz

References

Frontier albums
Albums produced by Yoko Kanno
Anime soundtracks